Imbringen is a village in the commune of Junglinster, in central Luxembourg.

 it has population of 312 inhabitants.

References

Junglinster
Towns in Luxembourg